The Scottish Championship Leagues (known as the RBS Championship Leagues for sponsorship reasons) formed the third tier in the Scottish rugby union system for amateur rugby union clubs in Scotland between 2012 and 2014.

History
The Championship Leagues were created for the 2012/13 season as part of a reconstruction which reduced the number of fully nationwide leagues from six to just two. A pyramid structure was implemented which saw the Championship Leagues sit between the National and Regional Leagues. The 20 teams were divided into Championship Leagues A and B along approximate east/west geographical lines.

At the 2013 Scottish Rugby Union AGM, a motion was successfully put forward by Haddington RFC and seconded by Selkirk RFC which called for the leagues to be restructured into three nationalised 12 team leagues below the Premiership. This meant the Championship Leagues would be replaced by National Leagues Divisions Two and Three.

Promotion and Relegation
The winners of both Championship A and B gained promotion at the end of the season to the National League. The bottom placed team in both Championship A and B were relegated to the appropriate Regional League. A third team was relegated in 2012/13 via a play-off between the 9th-placed team in each League.

In 2013/14 the play-off was scrapped along with relegation to the Regional Leagues. Teams finishing 2nd to 7th moved into National League Division Two, while the remaining three teams in each Championship League were joined by six the Regional Leagues to form National League Division Three.

Winners

See also
Scottish National League Division Two
Scottish National League Division Three

References

4
1973 establishments in Scotland
Recurring sporting events established in 1973

de:Scottish Hydro Electric Premiership
fr:Championnat d'Écosse de rugby à XV